Verna L. Jones-Rodwell (born November 27, 1955) is an American politician who represented the 44th legislative district in the Maryland State Senate. Senator Jones-Rodwell was also the chair of the Legislative Black Caucus of Maryland from 2007 to 2008.

Background
 
Jones-Rodwell was born in Baltimore, Maryland on November 27, 1955. She graduated from the University of Maryland College Park, B.A. (urban studies & community organization), 1978; Baruch College, City University of New York, M.P.A., 1987.

In the legislature
Jones-Rodwell became a member of Senate on January 8, 2003. She was assigned to the Senate's Budget and Taxation Committee in 2003. (public safety, transportation & environment subcommittee, 2003-); Joint Committee on Children, Youth, and Families, 2003-; Joint Committee on Federal Relations, 2003-; Special Committee on Substance Abuse, 2003-. Chair, Joint Committee on the Management of Public Funds, 2007-. Member, Special Joint Committee on Pensions, 2003. Jones-Rodwell is a former chair of the Legislative Black Caucus of Maryland and the current chair of the Baltimore City Senate Delegation.

On April 20, 2014, Jones-Rodwell announced that she had decided to retire and would not compete in the upcoming June 2014 democratic primary.

References

Democratic Party Maryland state senators
African-American state legislators in Maryland
African-American women in politics
Politicians from Baltimore
1955 births
Living people
University of Maryland, College Park alumni
Baruch College alumni
Women state legislators in Maryland
21st-century American politicians
21st-century American women politicians
21st-century African-American women
21st-century African-American politicians
20th-century African-American people
20th-century African-American women